Niemand is the German, Dutch and Afrikaans word for "nobody". It may also refer to:
Jason Niemand, South African cricketer
James Phillips (South African musician), South African rock singer known under the pseudonym "Bernoldus Niemand"
"Niemand", a B-side single by German industrial metal band Oomph! from their album Ego
"Niemand", B-side of Connie Francis' German single "Wenn ich träume"

See also
Niemand hört dich
Niemand sonst
Niemand heeft nog tijd
Keine Macht für Niemand
Niemandsland
Niemandsland and Beyond
Niemandsvriend
Nieman (surname)
Niemann, a surname
Nimanda Madushanka
Nirmand